Jackie Curtis (February 19, 1947 – May 15, 1985) was an American actress, writer, singer, and Warhol superstar.

Early life and career
Jackie Curtis was born in New York City to John Holder and Jenevive Uglialoro. She had one sibling, half-brother Timothy Holder, who is an openly gay Episcopal priest. Her parents divorced and she was mostly raised by her maternal grandmother, Ann Uglialoro, a well-known East Village bar owner known as Slugger Ann. Jackie performed as both a man and a woman throughout her career. While performing in drag, Curtis would typically wear lipstick, glitter, bright red hair, ripped dresses, and stockings. Curtis pioneered this combination of trashy and glamour, a style that has prompted assertions that Curtis inspired the glitter rock or glam rock movement of the 1970s.

Andy Warhol said of Curtis, "Jackie Curtis is not a drag queen. Jackie is an artist. A pioneer without a frontier." Primarily a stage actress, Curtis debuted at the age of 17 in Tom Eyen's play Miss Nefertiti Regrets produced in 1965 at La MaMa Experimental Theatre Club along with fellow newcomer Bette Midler. Curtis began writing her own plays immediately after this production. Her productions often featured well-known transgender people, such as Candy Darling and Holly Woodlawn. Curtis' work was influenced by the Playhouse of the Ridiculous, a resident company at La MaMa. As writer and lead actress, her plays included Glamour, Glory and Gold, which also starred Darling, Melba LaRose, Jr., and Robert De Niro in his first appearance on stage, playing several roles; Vain Victory, with Darling and Mario Montez; Amerika Cleopatra featuring Harvey Fierstein; Femme Fatale, with Patti Smith, Jayne County and Penny Arcade; and Heaven Grand in Amber Orbit with Ruby Lynn Reyner and Holly Woodlawn. Her final play "Champagne" ran at La Mama Experimental Theatre Club January 3–27, 1985 and featured George Abagnalo as the male lead.

While writing plays, Curtis continued to act. She reprised her role as Ptolemy II in a 1966 production of Miss Nefertiti Regrets at La MaMa. In 1969, she performed with the Playhouse of the Ridiculous in Tom Murrin's Cock-Strong alongside Penny Arcade, Anthony Ingrassia, and others. Music for the production was written by Ralph Czitrom and performed by the Silver Apples. She co-directed a production of her own play, Vain Victory, at La MaMa in 1971, and directed and performed in Nick Markovich's I Died Yesterday at La MaMa in 1983.

Andy Warhol and director Paul Morrissey cast Curtis and Darling in Flesh (1968) and, with the addition of Holly Woodlawn, in Women in Revolt (1971), a comedic spoof of the women's liberation movement.

Curtis was also a singer and poet. In 1974, Curtis and Woodlawn appeared in Cabaret in the Sky at the New York Cultural Center. An album by Paul Serrato collecting songs from the Curtis works Lucky Wonderful and Vain Victory, including the love ballad "Who Are You", which Curtis sang to Darling, was released in 2004. Curtis' poem "B-Girls", much of which is based on her observations of people who visited her grandmother's bar, Slugger Ann's, was included in the 1979 book The Poets' Encyclopedia. At eight pages long, it was the longest poem in the book.

Jackie Curtis made two more movies during the 1980s.

Death
She had a drug addiction, and died from a heroin overdose in 1985.

In popular culture
 Curtis is named in Lou Reed's 1972 song "Walk on the Wild Side" which was about the 'superstars' Reed knew from Warhol's Factory. The verse speaks of her drug addiction and fascination with James Dean: "Jackie is just speeding away / Thought she was James Dean for a day / Then I guess she had to crash / Valium would have helped that bash".
 In 2004, a documentary Superstar in a Housedress exposed some little-known facts about Curtis to a wider public. Curtis's influence on a number of people, including friends and associates such as Holly Woodlawn, Joe Dallesandro, and Penny Arcade, and observers such as David Bowie, are noted in the film. Jayne County writes of Curtis as being "...the biggest influence on me at this time."

Filmography

Plays (as playwright)
Glamour, Glory and Gold (1967)
Lucky Wonderful 
Amerika Cleopatra (1968)
Heaven Grand in Amber Orbit (1970)
Femme Fatale
Vain Victory: Vicissitudes of the Damned (1971)
The Trojan Women (1972)Tyrone X (1979)
I Died Yesterday (1983) (play written by Nick Markovich with additional dialogue by Curtis)
Champagne (1985)

References

External links

 
Website for 2004 documentary Jackie Curtis: Superstar In A Housedress
Article about Superstar In A Housedress
Jackie Curtis at the Warhol Superstars Website
Melba LaRose, star of Glamour, Glory and Gold, talks about Jackie Curtis

Curtis' page on La MaMa Archives Digital Collections

1947 births
1985 deaths
American LGBT dramatists and playwrights
LGBT people from New York (state)
Deaths by heroin overdose in New York (state)
Drug-related deaths in New York City
People associated with The Factory